Annona mucosa is a species of flowering plant in the custard-apple family, Annonaceae, that is native to tropical South America. It is cultivated for its edible fruits, commonly known as biribá, lemon meringue pie fruit, or wild sugar-apple, throughout the world's tropics and subtropics.

Common names
The Brazilian name, biribá has become somewhat well known.  Nonetheless, the fruits are occasionally known by other names, including wild sugar apple and aratiku.

Description
Biribá is a fast-growing, flood-tolerant, sun-loving tropical tree, with leaves up to 35 cm long. The fruit is large, conical or round, green when unripe, ripening to yellow. Its surface is covered with soft spines or protuberances which bruise and blacken with handling, giving it an unappealing appearance. This delicacy, together with a shelf life of less than a week, has limited its commercial cultivation. However, it is an increasingly popular tree for homestead cultivation in tropical areas.

The fruit pulp is very soft and sweet, tasting somewhat like a lemon meringue pie. Some reports of the flavor are extremely favorable, others more moderate. It is generally eaten out of the hand, though some chefs have used it for cooking, and wine has been made out of it in Brazil.

Cultivars
Propagation is usually by seeds, which can remain viable for 2 years kept dry and in the dark, though air-layering and grafting are possible to preserve specific cultivars. Grafting onto rootstocks of Annona montana or Annona glabra causes dwarfing. Little work establishing superior cultivars has been done and considerable genetic variability exists. ‘Regnard’ is perhaps the best known cultivar, which was introduced into the Philippines in 1917. The largest is 'biribá do Alto Solimoes', developed in Brazil, which can weigh up to 4 kg, making it probably the third largest fruit of the Annona family after the junglesop and the soursop.

Other uses
The wood of the biribá tree is durable and suitable for boat construction.

References

External links
 

deliciosa
Tropical fruit
Flora of South America
Flora of Brazil
Trees of South America
Taxobox binomials not recognized by IUCN